North Kilvington is a hamlet and civil parish in the Hambleton district of North Yorkshire, England. It is situated just off the A19, about two miles north of Thirsk.  In the 2001 census, North Kilvington had a population of 23. The population of the civil parish was estimated at 30 in 2014.

References

External links

Villages in North Yorkshire
Civil parishes in North Yorkshire
Hambleton District